High Point Friends School (HPFS), is a Quaker institution in High Point, North Carolina, USA, founded by members of High Point Monthly Meeting in 1963. It is an independent, secondary school serving approximately 109 students, aged 12 months to 8th grade. The school offers a standard learning experience.

Facilities
The school is located on the grounds of High Point Friends Meeting at 800 Quaker Lane in central High Point. Its main building is the Honbarrier Educational Center, a brick, Georgian Revival-style building that includes a media center/library and classrooms for lower and middle school classes. The campus includes a gymnasium with two rock climbing walls named after the teacher Adam Worley, a theater stage, gardens tended by middle school students and a small soccer field. No lunch is prepared on campus.

Fund raising and community support
The school hosts a yearly golf tournament to raise funds to support its financial aid fund.

History
HPFS was established as a pre-school and half-day kindergarten in 1963. In 1998, the school expanded to include grades 1 to 5. In 2003, the new Honbarrier Educational Center opened to house all functions of the lower school. In 2006, the school expanded to include a middle school, with grades 6-8.

References

External links
 High Point Friends School

Quaker schools in North Carolina
Educational institutions established in 1963
Schools in Guilford County, North Carolina
Buildings and structures in High Point, North Carolina
Private middle schools in North Carolina
Private elementary schools in North Carolina
1963 establishments in North Carolina